Thích Phổ Tuệ (April 12, 1917 – October 21, 2021) was a Vietnamese Buddhist monk. In 2007 until his death, he held the position of Supreme Patriarch for the Buddhist Sangha of Vietnam.

Early life 
His hometown was Khanh Tien commune, Yen Khanh district, Ninh Binh province. He was ordained at the age of 5.

Works 
Thích translated various works throughout his life, including; Phật Tổ tam kinh (Three Sutras of the Buddhas and Ancestors),  Bát-nhã dư âm, and  Đề cương kinh Pháp hoa.

References 

1917 births
2021 deaths
Vietnamese Buddhist monks
Vietnamese centenarians
Men centenarians
People from Ninh Bình province